Springfree Trampoline is a company that manufactures recreational trampoline products and accessories. The design was created by Dr. Keith Vivian Alexander, a Professor in the Mechanical Engineering Department at the University of Canterbury in Christchurch, New Zealand.

History

After analyzing trampoline data in 1992, Dr. Keith Vivian Alexander of Canterbury University, Christchurch, New Zealand, noted three major impact zones on the trampoline designed by George Nissen; These impact zones needed to be re-engineered to increase  the trampoline's safety by changing the technology of the springs. Doing this made the springs more advanced and better in their cause because they were more safe and made more potential energy in them. These were:
The springs – on the jumping surface.
The steel frame – on the jumping surface/ jumpers may fall and injure themselves.
The ground or obstructions on the ground – jumpers would hit as a result of falling off.

In 1999, he released his first prototype utilizing glass-reinforced plastic rods and the first commercial versions began selling in late 2004. In 2009, Springfree Trampoline won an Australian Design Award.

Design

The Springfree trampoline's design includes the use of glass-reinforced plastic rods as opposed to the steel spring coils of a regular trampoline. The jumping surface is lowered around 450mm below the jumping surface of a traditional trampoline, and the base is also more rigid.

References

External links
Springfree Trampoline Company Website

Trampolining
New Zealand design